Love Child is a 2014 South Korean-American documentary film directed by Valerie Veatch. Veatch produced the film with David Foox. The film premiered in-competition in the World Cinema Documentary Competition at 2014 Sundance Film Festival on January 17, 2014.

The film was theatrically released by HBO on June 18, 2014.

Synopsis
The film narrates the story of a South Korean couple, who were immersed in an online game called Prius Online, while their baby named Sarang died of malnutrition.

Reception
Love Child received mixed to positive reviews upon its premiere at the 2014 Sundance Film Festival. Christie Ko in his review for ScreenCrave gave the film 6/10 and said that "This documentary is not an exhaustive look at the addiction to gaming, but does a good job of explaining this incident of the couple and their baby in South Korea. It is thorough in its treatment of their story. But it scratched the surface of broader implications that left me with many questions." While, Daniel Fienberg of HitFix said in his review that Love Child never attempts to cheapen the tragedy of Sarang's death, but like "Web Junkie," it wants to lay out a pattern of behavior that might seem a little extreme, but also won't feel that outlandish to anybody who counts the Internet among the spaces in which they feel most social."

References

External links
 Official website
 

2014 films
2014 documentary films
American documentary films
South Korean documentary films
HBO documentary films
Documentary films about child abuse
2010s English-language films
2010s American films
2010s South Korean films